, known by his pen name , was a Japanese author and former yakuza. Outside Japan he is best known for writing the manga series Rainbow: Nisha Rokubō no Shichinin in collaboration with artist Masasumi Kakizaki. As a teenager Abe became a member of the Ando-gumi yakuza family, and was later recruited by the Koganei-ikka. In 1986, after leaving the yakuza life, he wrote a novel about his time in Fuchū Prison titled , which became a bestseller and was adapted into a film. Abe died on September 2, 2019, from pneumonia, aged 82.

References

External links 
 
 

1937 births
2019 deaths
Deaths from pneumonia in Japan
Manga writers
People from Tokyo
Japanese writers
Yakuza members